Greg Edgelow (born February 10) is a retired freestyle wrestler from Canada and is a nationally certified Wrestling Coach and Aboriginal Coach with Cree Ancestral Heritage and European mix (Irish, Norwegian and Scottish).  In 2018, Greg was inducted into the BC Sports Hall of Fame, Indigenous Gallery. He represented Canada at the 1992 Summer Olympics in Barcelona, Spain and won a bronze medal at the 1990 Goodwill Games in Seattle, two bronze medals at the 1991 Pan American Games in Havana, Cuba and a gold medal at the 1994 Commonwealth Games in Victoria.  He is an eight-time Canadian senior champion (7 Freestyle and 1 Greco). Edgelow is the only Canadian to win a medal in wrestling (bronze) at the Goodwill Games ever. He is also the only Canadian wrestler to win four separate consecutive senior weight classes in Freestyle (82 kg, 90 kg, 96 kg, 100 kg). His last national title was in 1998, the same year that he represented Canada (100 Kg) at the World Championships in Tehran, Iran.

Edgelow was awarded the 1999 Canadian Sport Leadership Award for his athletic achievements and leadership in volunteerism, beating out fellow finalists Wayne Gretzky and downhill skier Brian Stemmle. Edgelow created Canada's only amateur wrestling radio show, the Wrestling Edge Radio Show, where he interviewed over 150 guests, including some of the most prolific wrestlers in history and some top MMA athletes. Greg has travelled to 96 countries, 68 world capitals and 27 Olympic Host cities through sport, business and leisure travelling.

Born in Edmonton, Alberta, Edgelow grew up in Coquitlam, Penticton, Vernon, until he completed high school, and then Burnaby where he completed his undergraduate degree on a 4 year scholarship and now resides in Vancouver. Greg works in Indigenous relations at the corporate level. He has been involved in the Canadian sport, tourism, entertainment and First Nations communities where he has also participated on numerous volunteer boards of directors and councils, including 60 committees. In business, Edgelow has managed non-profits and has aligned himself with some well recognized national and international branded companies. His volunteer experiences allowed him to develop and participate on nine adjudication committees in which he has chaired five and helped adjudicate small grants totalling almost five million dollars for sport infrastructure development to needy communities across the country and  one million dollars in grants to top-performing, volunteer-driven, world-caliber athletes representing Canada. Edgelow was the motivational speaker at the Parade of Nations for the 1997 North American Indigenous Games (NAIG)-Victoria and member of Team BC Mission Staff at NAIG 2006-Denver and Assistant Chef de Mission at NAIG 2008-Cowichan. Greg worked with the Boys under 16 Soccer team at the 2017 NAIG-Toronto where they earned GOLD. Edgelow helps out on occasion with the wrestling clubs around Greater Vancouver as well as coaching First Nation youth around the province. Greg and his father created an endowed scholarship fund at Simon Fraser University in 1996 that has financially assisted over 30 university wrestlers since its creation. A few of the Boards Greg has served on include: BC Wrestling, SFU Alumni, Sport BC, Canadian Sport Tourism Alliance, Athletes CAN, Commonwealth Games Canada & Blanket BC.

1991 Pan American Games (Greco 90 kg)----------------------------------------------------------------------------------------------------------1991 Pan American Games (Freestyle 90 kg)

1994 Commonwealth Games (100 Kg)----------------------------------- 1999 Canadian Sport Leadership Award

Achievements

Canadian National Wrestling Championships

World Wrestling Championships

Major Canadian & International Games

International

Scholastic

References

Wrestling Edge Radio Show

1964 births
Living people
First Nations sportspeople
Cree people
Commonwealth Games gold medallists for Canada
Olympic wrestlers of Canada
Pan American Games bronze medalists for Canada
Sportspeople from Edmonton
Wrestlers at the 1992 Summer Olympics
Canadian male sport wrestlers
Wrestlers at the 1994 Commonwealth Games
Commonwealth Games medallists in wrestling
Pan American Games medalists in wrestling
Wrestlers at the 1991 Pan American Games
Goodwill Games medalists in wrestling
Competitors at the 1990 Goodwill Games
Medalists at the 1991 Pan American Games
Medallists at the 1994 Commonwealth Games